The Divisiones Regionales de Fútbol in the Cantabria, are organized by the Cantabrian Football Federation:
Regional Preferente (Level 6 of the Spanish football pyramid)
Primera Regional (Level 7)
Segunda Regional (Level 8)

League chronology
Timeline

Regional Preferente de Cantabria

The Regional Preferente de Cantabria is one of the lower levels of the Spanish Football League. It is held every year. It stands at the sixth level of Spanish football. All of the clubs are based in Cantabria.

The League 
The league consists of one group of 18 teams. At the end of the season, the first, second and third are promoted to Tercera División RFEF - Group 3. The bottom three are relegated to the Primera Regional de Cantabria.

2022–23 teams

Champions

Primera Regional de Cantabria

The Primera Regional de Cantabria is one of the lower levels of the Spanish Football League. It is held every year. It stands at the seventh level of Spanish football. All of the clubs are based in Cantabria.

The league
The league consists of one group of 18 teams. At the end of the season, the first three teams are promoted to the Regional Preferente de Cantabria league, and the last three are relegated to the Segunda Regional de Cantabria league.

2022–23 teams

Segunda Regional de Cantabria

The Segunda Regional de Cantabria is one of the lower levels of the Spanish Football League. It is held every year. It stands at the eighth level of Spanish football. All of the clubs are based in Cantabria.

The league
The league consists of one group of 20 teams. At the end of the season three clubs are promoted to the Primera Regional de Cantabria league.

External links
Federación Cántabra de Fútbol

Divisiones Regionales de Fútbol
Football in Cantabria

es:Primera Regional de Cantabria
es:Regional Preferente de Cantabria
pt:Regional Preferente de Cantabria